Cheney High School is a four-year public high school in Cheney, Washington serving the Cheney School District. The school has a population of 1,300 students in grades 9–12, with more than 70 full-time equivalent teaching staff. Cheney athletic teams compete in the Greater Spokane League (3A class) as the Blackhawks, and the school colors are red and black.

Building
In 1929, voters approved the construction of a new high school, after school district consolidation was anticipated to exceed the capacity of the existing building, which was completed in 1913. Plans were drawn up to move the junior high into the 1913 building, demolish an older building (1893) and reuse its bricks for the construction of a new school. The first event at the new building was a basketball game against Davenport High School, held on January 7, 1930; students and teachers moved in two weeks later, on January 22.

In 1966, a new open-campus high school was built at the present location on North 6th Street; junior high classes were moved to the 1930 high school, which was renamed Fisher Junior High. When the new junior high school building was completed in 1977, the 1930 high school building was taken over and reused as administrative offices by the school district until 2012, when offices were moved to the former Nike missile base designated F-37 on Andrus Road near Four Lakes.

The total cost of the expansion was estimated at $28.53 million in 2017.

Activities
Cheney High School competes in the Greater Spokane League (GSL), moving up to the WIAA 3A classification for the 2020–21 school year. Previously, Cheney had competed in the Great Northern League (GNL), which was reorganized from the Frontier League in 1998, in the 2A/AA class. In 2002, Cheney entered the GSL as a 3A class school, but was reclassed to 2A in 2004 and returned to the GNL.

Notable alumni
 Michael P. Anderson ('77), astronaut
 Steve Emtman ('88), professional football player

References

External links

High schools in Spokane County, Washington
Public high schools in Washington (state)